Dicorynia is a genus of flowering plants in the legume family, Fabaceae. It belongs to the subfamily Dialioideae.

References

Dialioideae
Fabaceae genera